Thomas Bowman may refer to:

Thomas Bowman (Methodist Episcopal bishop) (1817–1914), American bishop of the Methodist Episcopal Church, elected in 1872
Thomas Bowman (Evangelical Association bishop) (1836–1923), bishop of the Evangelical Association, elected in 1875
Thomas Bowman (Iowa politician) (1848–1917), US congressman from Iowa
Thomas Elliot Bowman III (1918–1995), American zoologist
Thomas G. Bowman (born 1946), United States Deputy Secretary of Veterans Affairs
Thomas Richard Bowman (1835–1911), South Australian pastoralist
Tom Bowman (actor), British actor in television and films such as The Treasure of San Teresa
Tom Bowman (journalist), American investigative reporter 
Tom Bowman (rugby union) (born 1976), Australian rugby union footballer
Tommy Bowman (1873–1958), Scottish footballer who played in 1890s and 1900s

See also
Thomas Bowman Brewer (born 1932), American academic
Thomas M. Bowen (1835–1906), U.S. senator